Argüello is a Spanish surname, most commonly associated with the early settlers in the cities of Granada, Nicaragua and of Córdoba, Argentina, as well as throughout Mexico and, in the United States, in what is now the state of California, the so-called Californio Argüellos.

A list of politicians and other notables bearing the surname in the above countries, as well as in a few others, ordered by date of birth, follows:

Eminent Argentineans
Jorge Argüello (born 1956), politician and diplomat
Roberto Argüello (born 1963), former tennis player
Facundo Argüello (footballer) (born 1979), footballer
Martín Vassallo Argüello (born 1980), former tennis player
Marcos Argüello (born 1981), goalkeeper
Facundo Argüello (tennis) (born 1992), tennis player
Irma Arguello, (b.1970) international security expert

Noteworthy Nicaraguans
 Juan Argüello del Castillo y Guzmán, (1778-1830), Deputy Head of State 1826–7; Head of State 1827–9, son of Narciso Jose Argüello y Monsivais (Cadiz, Spain, 1714-Granada, Nicaragua 1771). Narciso, with his older brother Diego Nicolas Argüello y Monsivais (1706-1770), are the founders of the Arguello family in Nicaragua.
 Jose Argüello Arce (1821-1897), President of Congress, 1865–6, 1877–79, great-grandson of Diego Nicolas Argüello y Monsivais. 
 Santiago Argüello Barreto, (1871-1940) poet and politician, President of Congress, brother of President Leonardo Argüello Barreto and direct descendant of Narciso Jose Argüello y Monsivais.
 Angélica Balladares Montealegre de Argüello Vargas, (1872 – 1973). 1st Lady of the Liberal Party, 1927–1973; President of the Nicaraguan Feminist League, 1931–1937; "Woman of the Americas" 1959 as per the Union of American Women; Congressional Gold Medal 1969 laureate, spouse of Guillermo Argüello Vargas.
Leonardo Argüello Barreto,(1875-1947) Interior, Education and Foreign Minister; President of Nicaragua, 1947, direct descendant of Narciso Jose Argüello y Monsivais.
 Solón Argüello Escobar, (1879 -1913) poet and politician, nationalized Mexican then private Secretary to Mexican President Francisco Madero. He was a cousin of Leonardo Argüello Barreto and a direct descendant of Narciso Jose Argüello y Monsivais.
 Guillermo Argüello Vargas ( 1888–1965) Minister of Education, 1924–26, Minister of Finance 1928–32, 1947; grandson of José Argüello Arce; spouse of Angelica Balladares Montealegre
 Mariano Argüello Vargas (1890-1970); President of Congress 1937, 1950, 1965; Foreign Minister 1939–41, and 1943–46 ( Nicaragua's Act of Chapultepec and United Nations Charter main signatary, March and June, 1945); Vice-President of Nicaragua, 1947, grandson of José Argüello Arce
 Alejandro Arguello Montiel (1907-1997), President of the Nicaraguan Chamber of Deputies 1948, Ambassador to Costa Rica, Peru, Chile, Guatemala, Argentina, Mexico, Cuba and the Holy Sea and great-grandson of Jose Arguello Arce. 
 Federico Argüello Solorzano (1914-2011) Monsignor, Society of Jesus, Honoris Causa in the Humanities, uncle of Ambassador Carlos Argüello Gómez and direct descendant of Narciso Jose Argüello y Monsivails.
 Alejandro Montiel Argüello (1917-2012), Nicaragua's main signatary of Rio Treaty 1948, Foreign Minister 1959–63 and 1971–78, nephew of Mariano Argüello Vargas, great-grandson of Jose Arguello Arce and direct descendant of both Narciso Jose and Diego Nicolas Argüello y Monsivais. 
 Mariana Sansón (Balladares) Argüello (1918 – 2002), poet, grandniece of Angélica Balladares de Argüello and direct descendant of Narciso Jose Argüello y Monsivais
 Miriam Argüello Morales, (1927 –2019), President of the Nicaraguan Congress (1990–91) and direct descendant of Narciso Jose Argüello y Monsivais
 Silvio Reynaldo Argüello Cardenal, Vice-President, 1963–67, direct descendant of Narciso Jose Argüello y Monsivais.
 Rene Sandino Arguello,  1930-2005, Member of Congress, President of the Conservative Party and direct descendant of Narciso Jose Argüello y Monsivais.
 Jorge Salazar Argüello, (1939 – 1980), coffee grower, leader of UPANIC (Union of Agricultural Producers of Nicaragua) and direct descendant of Narciso Jose Argüello y Monsivais
 Guillermo Argüello Poessy ( 1941–2014), Vice Minister of Foreign Affairs, 2000, Pres. GAO, Comptroller, 2001–2014; half brother of Alejandro Arguello Montiel, nephew of Guillermo Arguello Vargas, great-grandson of Jose Argüello Arce and direct descendant of Diego Nicolas Argüello y Monsivais. 
Patrick Argüello Ryan (1943 – 1970), US/Nicaraguan national member of the Popular Front for the Liberation of Palestine and direct descendant of Narciso Jose Argüello y Monsivais
Carlos Argüello Gómez (1946- ) Justice Minister 1979–83, Chief Nicaraguan Negotiator and Ambassador to the UN World Court in the Hague, Netherlands, (1983–91, 1996 to date; nephew of Monsignor Federico Argüello Solorzano, great, great-grandson of Jose Arguello Arce and direct descendant of both Narciso Jose and Diego Nicolas Argüello y Monsivais.
 Norman Caldera Cardenal ( Argüello); (1946-), Foreign Minister (2002–07); Minister of Development, Industry, and Trade (1999-2001), direct descendant of Narciso Jose Argüello y Monsivais.. 
 Luis Eduardo Montiel (Argüello) Morales (1949- ) Finance Minister 2004–2006, nephew of Alejandro Montiel Argüello great, great-grandson of Jose Arguello Arce and direct descendant of both Narciso Jose and Diego Nicolas Arguello y Monsivais.
 Alexis Argüello Bohórquez (1952-2009) World Champion boxer, member of the International Boxing Hall of Fame, politician, Mayor of Managua and direct descendant of Narciso Jose Argüello y Monsivais
 Francisco Rosales Argüello, (1958-) Magistrate of the Nicaraguan Supreme Court, (2005 to date) great-grandnephew of Santiago and Leonardo Arguello Barreto, and direct descendant of Narciso Jose Argüello y Monsivais..
 Noel Vidaurre Argüello, (1955-) Vice Minister of Finance and Economy 1990–1992, direct descendant of Narciso Jose Argüello y Monsivais.
 Dora Maria Tellez Argüello, (1955– ), Minister of Health (1979-1985) and direct descendant of Narciso Jose Argüello y Monsivais.
 Roberto J. Argüello Osorio (1955-), Nicaraguan banker, magazine editor (Vida y Exito) and direct descendant of Juan Argüello del Castillo y Guzmán, Narciso Jose Argüello y Monsivais and Roberto Arguello-Tefel
 Maria de los Angeles Arguello Robelo de Arguello Herdocia, (1961-), Minister of Health (1998-2001) and direct descendant of Narciso Arguello y Monsivais 
 Bertha Marina Argüello Roman de Rizo Pallais (1973-) Vice Minister of Family (199) and of Foreign Affairs (2002), daughter of Guillerno Argüello Poessy and direct descendant of Diego Nicolas Argüello y Monsivais.

Prominent individuals from Spain and other countries in the Western Hemisphere
Manuel Argüello Mora (1834 – 1902), noted Costa Rican writer and novelist.
Carlos Anibal Altamirano Argüello (1942 – 2015), Ecuadorian Roman Catholic bishop
Ricardo Arguello, Mexican sprinter
Alejandro Argüello (born 1982), Mexican footballer
Francisco Argüello (born 1982), Paraguayan footballer
Arturo Argüello Loucel, Salvadorean Foreign Minister and main signatory of the Act of Chapultepec, in 1945, and President of the Supreme Court from 1946 to 1948.
Francisco José Gómez de Argüello y Wirtz, also known as Kiko Argüello (born 1939), Spanish artist and co-initiator of the Neocatechumenal Way
Betzabeth Argüello (born 1991), Venezuelan freestyle wrestler

Renown  Californios and US nationals
José Darío Argüello (1753 – 1828), Spanish soldier and California pioneer who was one of the founders of the city of Los Angeles and twice a Spanish colonial Governor of the Alta, as well as the Baja California Peninsula. He was the father of Mexican Governor of Alta California Luis Antonio Argüello and of Concepción Argüello. The headland known as Point Arguello, now a part of Vandenberg Air Force Base was named after him by explorer George Vancouver in 1792. 
Luis Antonio Argüello (1784 – 1830), the first Californio (native-born) governor of Alta California. The Boulevard leading up to the Presidio of San Francisco, CA, is named after him. 
Concepción Argüello (1791 – 1857), Alta Californian daughter of José Darío Argüello and noted for her romance with Russian nobleman and diplomat Nikolai Rezanov.
Santiago Argüello (1791 – 1862), Mexican Californio, a soldier in the Spanish army of the Viceroyalty of New Spain in Las Californias, a major Mexican land grant ranchos owner
Maria Soledad Ortega (de Arguello) (1797 – 1874), spouse of José Darío Argüello heiress to Rancho de las Pulgas
Santiago E. Argüello (1813 – 1857), Mexican Californio and son of Santiago Argüello
José Ramon Argüello, Mexican Californio and son of Santiago Argüello
Christine Arguello (1955-), United States District Judge of the United States District Court for the District of Colorado and former Colorado state official
Marcella Arguello (1985-), US comedian

See also
http://rulers.org/indexa4.html
Muelle

Spanish-language surnames